There are many communities in Ontario, Canada named Maple Grove:

Maple Grove, Brant County, Ontario
Maple Grove, Dufferin County, Ontario
Maple Grove, Durham Regional Municipality, Ontario
Maple Grove, Huron County, Ontario
Maple Grove, Leeds and Grenville United Counties, Ontario
Maple Grove, Middlesex County, Ontario
Maple Grove, Simcoe County, Ontario
Maple Grove, Ontario (ghost town) (displaced by the St. Lawrence seaway)